Ginger Gold (foaled January 26, 1999) is a Canadian Champion filly Thoroughbred racehorse. Bred by Hamilton, Ontario lumber merchant, Mel Lawson, she was sired by multiple stakes winner Golden Gear, a son of 1988 American Champion Sprint Horse, Gulch. Her dam was  Gleaming Glory and her damsire the highly regarded multiple American Grade 1 winner, Vigors.

Raced under Lawson's Jim Dandy Stable banner, Ginger Gold was trained by Sid Attard who guided her to a Champion season in 2001. At age three, she won the Woodbine Oaks, the premier event for Canadian-foaled three-year-old fillies.

Ginger Gold raced at age four with her best stakes race result a second-place finish in the Ontario Matron Stakes. She was retired to broodmare duty having earned in excess of $1 million. Her first foal, born in 2006, was sired by Claiborne Farm's,  Pulpit.

References
 Ginger Gold's pedigree and partial racing stats

1999 racehorse births
Thoroughbred family 9
Racehorses bred in Ontario
Racehorses trained in Canada
Sovereign Award winners